Eilema prabhasana is a moth of the  subfamily Arctiinae. It is found on Java.

References

 Natural History Museum Lepidoptera generic names catalog

prabhasana